Chymomyza aldrichii is a species of vinegar fly in the family Drosophilidae.

References

Further reading

External links

 

Drosophilidae
Insects described in 1916